The UNAF Women's Tournament is a football (soccer) women's tournament held between nations who are a member of the UNAF association. The first edition was played in 2009 in Tunisia and only three teams participated, Tunisia, Algeria and Egypt.

History

Format

Results

 A round-robin tournament determined the final standings.

Successful national teams

* hosts.

Participating nations

Legend

See also
UNAF U-21 Women's Tournament
UNAF U-20 Women's Tournament

Notes and references

External links
 2009 UNAF Women's Tournament - cafonline official website

 

 
UNAF competitions